Les Authieux-sur-Calonne is a commune in the Calvados department in the Normandy region of north-western France.

The inhabitants of the commune are known as Altaréens or Altaréennes.

Geography
Les Authieux-sur-Calonne is located some 55 km north-east of Caen and 27 km south-east of Le Havre. Access to the commune is by the D534 road from Cormeilles in the south-east which passes through the north of the commune and the village and continues to join the D675 just west of the commune. The D140 road goes south from the village through the length of the commune to Le Mesnil-sur-Blangy in the south. Apart from the village there are the hamlets of La Route de Blangy, La Boudiniere, and La Grenterie. The commune is mostly farmland with some scattered forests.

The Calonne river forms the north-eastern border of the commune as it flows north-west then west to join the Touques at Pont-l'Évêque. Several tributaries rise in the commune and flow north to join the Calonne including the Douet de la Thibaudiere, the Ruisseau des Rebutieres, the Ruisseau du Val Plot, and the Ryisseau de Manoir.

Heraldry

Administration

List of Successive Mayors

Demography
In 2017 the commune had 286 inhabitants.

Culture and heritage

Civil heritage
The commune has two buildings and structures that are registered as historical monuments:
The Manoir de la Porte (18th century)
The Tanning and Wheat Mill (1853)

Religious heritage

The commune has one religious building that is registered as an historical monument:
The Chapel Saint-Meuf The Chapel contains one item that is registered as an historical object:
The Portal (16th century)

The Parish Church of Saint-Pierre contains many items that are registered as historical objects:
5 Statues (17th century)
A Tabernacle, 2 seating sets, Tabernacle housing (17th century)
A Painting: the Assumption (17th century)
A Retable (17th century)
The Altar facing (17th century)
The main Altar (17th century)
The main Altar (17th century)
The Altar facing (17th century)
A Statue: Saint Nicolas (16th century)
A Stoup and portable Stoup (15th century)

Notable people linked to the commune
 Henry Victor Deligny (1855-1938 at Authieux-sur-Calonne), General of Division in the First World War.

See also
Communes of the Calvados department

References

External links
A Visit to the village of Authieux-sur-Calonne and its environment
Les Authieux-sur-Calonne on Géoportail, National Geographic Institute (IGN) website 
Les Autieux-sur-Calone on the 1750 Cassini Map

Communes of Calvados (department)